Glipostenoda pseudexcisa is a species of beetle in the genus Glipostenoda. It was described in 1975.

References

pseudexcisa
Beetles described in 1975